A total lunar eclipse took place at the Moon's descending node of the orbit on Tuesday, May 24, 1910 with an umbral eclipse magnitude of 1.09503. A total lunar eclipse takes place when the Earth comes between the Sun and the Moon and its shadow covers the Moon. Eclipse watchers can see the Moon turn red when the eclipse reaches totality. Total eclipses of the Moon happen at Full Moon when the Sun, Earth, and Moon are aligned to form a line. The astronomical term for this type of alignment is syzygy, which comes from the Greek word for being paired together. The Moon does not have its own light but shines because its surface reflects the Sun's rays. During a total lunar eclipse, the Earth comes between the Sun and the Moon and blocks any direct sunlight from reaching the Moon. The Sun casts the Earth's shadow on the Moon's surface. A shallow total eclipse saw the Moon in relative darkness for 49 minutes and 29.5 seconds. The Moon was 9.503% of its diameter into the Earth's umbral shadow, and should have been significantly darkened. The partial eclipse lasted for 3 hours, 35 minutes and 22.9 seconds in total.

Eclipse season
This event followed the total solar eclipse of May 9, 1910.

Visibility
It was completely visible over Australia, the Americas, Europe and Africa, seen rising over Australia and setting over Europe and Africa.

Related lunar eclipses

Saros series

It last occurred on May 11, 1892 and will next occur on June 3, 1928.

This is the 32nd member of Lunar Saros 129, and the first total eclipse. The next event is the June 1928 lunar eclipse. Lunar Saros 129 contains 11 total lunar eclipses between 1910 and 2090. Solar Saros 136 interleaves with this lunar saros with an event occurring every 9 years 5 days alternating between each saros series.

Inex series

Half-Saros cycle
A lunar eclipse will be preceded and followed by solar eclipses by 9 years and 5.5 days (a half saros). This lunar eclipse is related to two total solar eclipses of Solar Saros 136.

See also
List of lunar eclipses
List of 20th-century lunar eclipses

Notes

External links

1910-05
1910 in science